The Ministry of Justice of Palestine was established in 1994 after the partial lifting of the Israeli occupation in certain areas and the arrival of the Palestinian National Authority. The ministry aims to meet societal needs by establishing the rules of justice, equality and order.

List of ministers 

 Freih Abu Madin (1994–2002)
 Ibrahim Al-Daghmeh (2002)
 Zuhair Sourani (2002–2003)
 Abdul Karim Abu Salah (2003)
 Jawad Al-Tibi (2003)
 Nahed Al Rayes (2003–2005)
 Farid Al-Galad (2005–2006)
Ahmed Khalidi (2006–2007)
 Ali Sartawi (2007)
 Youssef Al-Mansi (2007–2008)
 Ahmed Shweidh (2008)
 Mohamed Farag Al Ghoul (2008–2012)
 Mazen Haniyeh (2012–2013)
Attallah Abu Sobh (2013–present)

See also 

 Justice ministry
 Politics of Palestine National Authority

References 

Justice ministries
Politics of the Palestinian National Authority